The ATL SkyTrain is an automated people mover (APM) at Hartsfield–Jackson Atlanta International Airport that runs 24/7 between the domestic terminal and rental car center.

Layout and operation 

The system opened on December 8, 2009, to connect the airport's domestic terminal with the newly opened rental car center and Gateway Center of the Georgia International Convention Center. Unlike The Plane Train, which is underground inside the secure zone of the airport, the ATL SkyTrain is located outside the airport's secure zone and is elevated, crossing Interstate 85. The ride between the terminal and the rental car center takes 5 minutes, a two and a half minute wait at each station. The station at the terminal is located on the west end of the Domestic Terminal, adjacent to MARTA's Airport station.

The system's announcements are voiced by professional voice talent Sharon Feingold, who is also the voice behind the Incline Railway at Lookout Mountain in Chattanooga, Tennessee, and since March 2012, the voice behind The Plane Train.

In 2020, the airport authority opened a new remote parking garage (ATL West) adjacent to the GICC Gateway stop, connected by an elevated walkway.

Rolling stock 
The system uses Mitsubishi Crystal Mover vehicles. There are 12 cars that run as six two-car trains, plus one maintenance vehicle. The vehicles are stored and maintained at a facility near the rental car center. The specifications for each car are as follows:
 Passenger capacity: 8/85 (seated/standing) per car
 Weight: 
 Length: 
 Width: 
 Height: 
 Top speed: 

See also 
List of airport people mover systems

References

External links 
ATL SkyTrain
Official Hartsfield-Jackson Atlanta International Airport website

Public transportation in Georgia (U.S. state)
Transportation in Atlanta
SkyTrain
Airport people mover systems in the United States
Crystal Mover people movers
Railway lines opened in 2009
2009 establishments in Georgia (U.S. state)